Gildor Roy (born May 11, 1960) is a Canadian actor. Gildor is the brother of Québécois actors Luc Roy, Yvon Roy and Maxim Roy.

Biography 
He is the ex-owner of a baseball - of which he was a player at first base - club in the Dominican Republic, from where his wife comes, also being a fan of the Boston Bruins.

Professionally, he was the host of the radio show C't'encore drôle with Michel Barrette on CKMF, and a regular on the comedy game show Piment Fort, hosted by Normand Brathwaite. From 2002 to 2003, he was the host of the show L'île de Gilidor. In 2009, he was the host of a  breakfast television program on TQS named Cafeine.

Awards and nominations 
He was nominated for a Genie in the 1992 Genie Awards for Best Performance by an Actor in a Leading Role for Requiem for a Handsome Bastard (Requiem pour un beau sans-coeur) (1992).

Filmography 
 À plein temps (unknown episodes, 1984) ....
 Épopée rock (unknown episodes, 1984) .... Gerry
 La grand remous (unknown episodes, 1989) ....
 Super sans plomb (unknown episodes, 1989) .... Robert Boissonneau
 Blanche est la nuit (1989) ....
 Ding et Dong, le film (1990) .... Chauffeur de taxi
 The Party (Le Party) (1990) .... Jacques
 Un autre homme (1990) ....
 Four Stiffs and a Trombone (L'assassin jouait du trombone) (1991) .... Le tatoué
 Des fleurs sur la neige (unknown episodes, 1991) ....
 Requiem for a Handsome Bastard (Requiem pour un beau sans-coeur) (1992) .... Louis-Régis Savoie
 La Florida (1993) .... Rheal also music and lyrics of Rent a Wreck and performer of La Quete (The Impossible Dream), Comme j'ai toujours envie d'aimer, Tu m'travailles, Rent a Wreck
 Miséricorde (1994) (TV) ....
 Louis 19, King of the Airwaves (Louis 19, le roi des ondes) (1994) .... Gai
 Sirens (1 episode, "Family Secrets", 1994).... Mr. Stevens
 10-07: L'affaire Zeus (1995) TV mini-series .... Phil Nadeau
 10-07: L'affaire Kafka (1996) TV mini-series .... Phil Nadeau
 Le retour (unknown episodes, 1996) .... François Jourdain
 Caboose (1996) .... Marceau
 Karmina (1996) .... Ghislain Chabot/Patrick
 km/h (unknown episodes, 1998) .... Germain Langlois
 Karmina 2 (2001) .... Ghislain Chabot
 The Mysterious Miss C. (La mystérieuse mademoiselle C.) (2002) .... Marcel Lenragé
 Les Boys IV (2005) .... Willie
 May God Bless America (Que Dieu bénisse l'Amérique) (2006) .... Maurice Ménard
 Duo (2006) .... Étienne Poulin
 Summit Circle (Contre toute espérance) (2007) .... Claude
 Babine (2008) .... Forgeron Riopel
 Ésimésac (2012) .... Forgeron Riopel
 Snowtime! (2015) - Chabot
 District 31 (2016-present), commander Daniel Chiasson
 Lâcher prise (2017-present)
 Ville Neuve (2018)

References

External links 
 
 Gildor Roy on Myspace

1960 births
Living people
Canadian male film actors
Canadian male television actors
French Quebecers
People from Montérégie
People from Rouyn-Noranda
Canadian television hosts
Male actors from Quebec
Canadian country singers
Canadian male singers
Singers from Quebec
French-language singers of Canada